William Jennings Miller (March 12, 1899 – November 22, 1950) was a U.S. Representative from Connecticut.

Biography 
Born in North Andover, Massachusetts to Canadian-born Catherine (née Stewart) and Scottish-born James B. Miller, Miller attended the public schools. He graduated from Cannon's Commercial College, Lawrence, Massachusetts, in 1917. During the First World War enlisted August 5, 1917, as a private in the United States Army and served in the Air Service in the 80th Aero Squadron and 1104 Aero Squadrons. Later commissioned a second lieutenant. He was injured in an airplane crash in France in 1918, resulting in the loss of both legs. He was discharged April 26, 1919. Patient in United States veterans' hospitals 1919–1931. He moved to Wethersfield, Connecticut, in 1926. He engaged in the insurance business in 1931.

Miller was elected as a Republican to the Seventy-sixth Congress (January 3, 1939 – January 3, 1941).
He was an unsuccessful candidate for reelection in 1940 to the Seventy-seventh Congress. Miller was elected to the Seventy-eighth Congress (January 3, 1943 – January 3, 1945). He was an unsuccessful candidate for reelection in 1944 to the Seventy-ninth Congress.

Miller was elected in 1946 to the Eightieth Congress (January 3, 1947 – January 3, 1949). He was an unsuccessful candidate for reelection in 1948 to the Eighty-first Congress. He resumed the general insurance business. He died in Wethersfield, Connecticut on November 22, 1950. He was interred in Jordan Cemetery, Waterford, Connecticut.

References

1899 births
1950 deaths
20th-century American politicians
American amputees
American people of Canadian descent
American people of Scottish descent
American politicians with disabilities
People from North Andover, Massachusetts
People from Wethersfield, Connecticut
Republican Party members of the United States House of Representatives from Connecticut
United States Army Air Service pilots of World War I
United States Army officers
Military personnel from Massachusetts